Long Live Our State is a Soviet patriotic song composed by Boris Alexandrovich Alexandrov with lyrics by Alexander Shilov. In 1943, it was considered as a candidate for the State Anthem of the Soviet Union.

The music was used in the October Revolution Parades from 1967, and the anthem of Transnistria adopted its melody.

Lyrics

After the death of Joseph Stalin, the lines

"According to Lenin's wise precepts
The party leads us to happiness.
And warmed by the Stalinist thought
The Country and Soviet people."

have been replaced with strings

"According to the wise precepts of Lenin
Our great people live.
On the road to happiness and light
The Party is guiding us wisely."

References

External links 
 
 
 

1943 songs
Compositions by Boris Alexandrovich Alexandrov
Russian military marches
Russian patriotic songs
Songs about Joseph Stalin
Songs about Russia
Soviet songs